Hard white may refer to:

Hard white, slang/street name for cocaine
Hard white soap
Hard white wheat, often called "Hard white winter wheat"
"Hard White (Up in the Club)", a music single by hip-hop artist Yelawolf featuring Lil Jon
"Hard White", a 2018 song by Nicki Minaj from her fourth studio album, Queen